Jamareo "Jam" Artis is an American bass guitarist. He is known for his work as bass guitarist for pop star Bruno Mars and for winning P. Diddy's MTV Making His Band in 2009.

In 2014, Jamareo recorded with Mark Ronson & Bruno Mars on "Uptown Funk", which lasted at No. 1 on the Hot 100 for 14 weeks. Artis also appears with Bruno Mars in the music videos for "Locked Out of Heaven", "Uptown Funk", "Gorilla", "Treasure", "24K Magic" and "Finesse". He also participated in Mars' 24K Magic World Tour.

Artis has performed on many television shows, such as the Super Bowl XLVIII Halftime Show, the Grammy Awards telecast, Saturday Night Live, Victoria's Secret Fashion Show, MTV Video Music Awards, Today Show, X Factor, The Ellen Degeneres Show, Jimmy Kimmel Live, Late Show with David Letterman, American Idol, MTV European Music Awards, Echo Awards, X Factor UK, among others. He played the bass on Keith Urban's song "Out the Cage" (featuring Breland and Nile Rodgers) taken from The Speed of Now Part 1 (2020).

Early life
Artis began playing the bass at the age of 10. He graduated from Ralph L. Fike High School in 2007.

Discography
Liberation (EP)
The Red BoomBox (LP)

References

American male bass guitarists
1989 births
Living people
Place of birth missing (living people)
21st-century American bass guitarists
21st-century American male musicians
21st-century African-American musicians